"Mistreated" is a song by the British rock band Deep Purple taken from their 1974 album Burn. The song was written by the band's guitarist Ritchie Blackmore and new vocalist David Coverdale, who, along with new bassist Glenn Hughes, brought new blues and funk elements to the band.

History 

At live performances Hughes would introduce "Mistreated" as a song that Blackmore had written about two years prior to Burn. Inspired by the Free song "Heartbreaker", the song had been considered for the band's earlier album Who Do We Think We Are, but Ritchie held it back. When work on Burn started, Coverdale wrote the lyrics to "Mistreated", and it is the only song on Burn where he sings the lyrics entirely himself. In the booklet of the 30th Anniversary Edition of Burn, Coverdale commented on the recording of the vocals on "Mistreated":
"We recorded "Mistreated" from 11pm to 7:30 in the morning. I heard the first playbacks and thought it was terrible. It was so bad I just sat down and cried because I wanted it to be so good. Then the next night we had another session and I did it on the second take. It's like progressive blues. I wasn't raised in a shack by the railroad tracks but I've still had emotional hassles and that's the only kind of blues I can interpret. I tried very hard because I knew it was essential to get the strong emotive quality the song needs. The thing I wanted was for somebody listening to the song to think: 'I know what he's talking about' and get the feeling, then the song would be worth it. It's essentially a physical feeling. The reason it didn't come off straight away was simply that I was trying too hard."

The longest track on the album, the song shifts gear and builds to a climax, Blackmore launching into a rapid solo, with Coverdale and Hughes building a wall of multi-tracked backing vocals before the song's end.

The song stayed in the band's set-list until Blackmore left in April 1975, and a live version was included on the Made in Europe album in 1976. Other live versions can be found on Live in London (1982), Live in Paris 1975 and on the video Live in California 74.

Later performances 

After Deep Purple broke up in 1976, David Coverdale continued performing "Mistreated" with his band Whitesnake (which has also included former Purple-bandmates Jon Lord and Ian Paice) until the early 1980s and briefly again in 1997. Live versions of the song are featured on the band's albums Live at Hammersmith and Live...in the Heart of the City. Whitesnake re-recorded "Mistreated" for their 2015 album of Deep Purple covers, The Purple Album.

Ritchie Blackmore also performed the song with his band Rainbow in the late 1970s, mid-90s and in 2010s during short Rainbow reunion. A live version can be heard on the group's albums On Stage (1977), Live in Germany 1976 and Live in Munich 1977 with Ronnie James Dio on vocals.  And, more recently, Hughes has rolled the song out at solo gigs (Soulfully Live in the City of Angels) as well as with his latest band Black Country Communion.

Cover versions 
 Ronnie James Dio had performed "Mistreated" during Angry Machines tour in 1996/97. A live version of the song can be found on the album Inferno: Last in Live.
 Swedish guitarist Yngwie Malmsteen had covered the song for his 1996 album Inspiration.
 German guitarist Axel Rudi Pell has been performing "Mistreated" from time to time at his live shows. Cover versions of the song are featured on Made in Germany (1995), Live on Fire (2012) and Magic Moments - 25th Anniversary Special Show (2015) albums.

Personnel
Ritchie Blackmore – guitar
David Coverdale – lead vocals
Glenn Hughes – bass, backing vocals
Jon Lord – keyboards
Ian Paice – drums, percussion

References

1974 songs
Deep Purple songs
Songs written by Ritchie Blackmore
Songs written by David Coverdale